Wulin Square is a square in the Xiacheng District of Hangzhou. It is served by the Wulin Square Station of the Hangzhou Metro.

References

Squares in Hangzhou